Restoring Hope (foaled May 5, 2015) is an American Thoroughbred racehorse who competed in the 2018 Belmont Stakes. He first garnered attention when he won a race in Santa Anita.

Restoring Hope became a subject of debate after competitors in the 2018 Belmont Stakes accused him of blocking other horses in order to help his stablemate, Justify who went on to win the Triple Crown. Restoring Hope was also trained by Bob Baffert who trained Justify as well.

Mike Repole who owned two other horses in the race said, "We watched [Resotring Hope] rush up like he was a quarter horse, make a quick right-hand turn, then turn left, pinned [Bravazo] on the rail. He looked like a bodyguard making sure nobody got close to Justify."

References

Racehorses trained in the United States
2015 racehorse births